Julie Bradshaw is a British teacher, sports coach, counsellor long-distance swimmer.

Early life and career
Born in Blackpool, United Kingdom, she first swam the English Channel at the age of 15. In 2006 she did it again using the moth swimming stroke, completing the swim in 121 hours, 18 minutes, and breaking the previous record by over nine hours. In 2006, she was awarded an MBE for 'Services to Swimming and Charity', and Loughborough University awarded her an honorary doctorate.

Julie Bradshaw resigned from her post at the Channel Swimming Association. The Association had taken legal action against her and her company GetSet4Success for retention of company documents and historic regalia in the Central London County Court; Bradshaw and the company were ordered on 20 July 2020 to return documents and badge of office and pay costs.

References

Year of birth missing (living people)
Living people
Female long-distance swimmers
Manhattan Island swimmers